Don't You Know Who I Think I Was? is a greatest hits album by the American rock band The Replacements, released in 2006 by Rhino Records. It includes eighteen tracks spanning the band's eight studio releases from 1981 to 1990, as well as two new tracks recorded specifically for this release. The new tracks—"Message to the Boys" and "Pool & Dive"—feature the three surviving original band members: singer and guitarist Paul Westerberg, bass guitarist Tommy Stinson, and drummer Chris Mars. However, Mars does not play drums on these tracks: they were played by session drummer Josh Freese while Mars sang backing vocals.

The album art is from the music video for "Alex Chilton". Westerberg stated in a 2006 interview with Newsweek that he had written "Message to the Boys" many years ago.

Track listing

Personnel

Ed Ackerson – engineer
John Akre – engineer
Paul Berry – assistant engineer
Michael Bosley – engineer
Peter Buck – guitar, track 6
Alex Chilton – guitar, backing vocals
Reggie Collins – discographical annotation
Jim Dickinson – producer, tracks 13–15
Peter Doell – engineer
Teenage Steve Douglas – baritone saxophone
Charley Drayton – drums
Slim Dunlap – guitar
East Memphis Slim – keyboards, vibraphone
Tommy Erdelyi – producer
Sheryl Farber – editorial supervision
Steven Fjelstad – producer, engineer
John Hampton – engineer, mixing
Heidi Hanschu – engineer
Joe Hardy – engineer, mixing
Dan Hersch – remastering
Darren Hill – producer
Bill Holdship – liner Notes
Max Huls – strings
Bill Inglot – remastering
Peter Jesperson – producer
John Beverly Jones – engineer
Karen LeBlanc – project assistant
Laura Levine – photography
Lisa Liese – product manager
Scott Litt – producer, engineer, mixing, track 18
Chris Lord-Alge – mixing
Andrew Love – tenor saxophone
Chris Mars – drums, tambourine, backing vocals, cowbell, foot stomping
Pat McDougal – engineer
Clif Norrell – engineer
James O'Toole – project assistant
Paul Stark – producer
Bob Stinson – lead guitar
Tommy Stinson – acoustic guitar, bass
Maria Villar – project assistant
Paul Westerberg – acoustic guitar, harmonica, mandolin, percussion, piano, electric guitar, vocals, producer, 6-string bass, lap steel guitar, 12-string electric guitar, 12-string acoustic guitar
Jeff White – project assistant
Mason Williams – producer

References

2006 greatest hits albums
The Replacements (band) compilation albums
Rhino Entertainment compilation albums
Albums produced by Tommy Ramone
Albums produced by Matt Wallace
Albums produced by Scott Litt
Albums produced by Jim Dickinson
Albums produced by Paul Westerberg